Cater Brothers was a supermarket chain based in the South East of England, which was later taken over and integrated into Presto chain owned by Allied Suppliers.

History
Cater Brothers Supermarkets was a natural progression for a family of butchers and greengrocers. Henry Charles Cater (1818-1868) was a pork merchant and latterly a pork butcher in the East End of London. Three of his four sons went on to become a cheesemonger, a grocer and a provisions merchant.

Henry John Cater, one of Henry Charles's sons, is shown in the 1881 census as being a grocer in Bridge Street, Mile End. It was his five sons who took the business over after his death in 1919, with his son Erastus being appointed chairman of the board. By the start of the Second World War the business had around 30 stores.

In 1956, Leslie Erastus, son of Erastus, had taken over the running of the business and was keen to move the company into the new self-service supermarket business. The first supermarket was opened in Bromley in 1958, with branches being added across the South East at a rate of around one a year. The new chain had stores as far away as Reading and Colchester, all supplied by a depot in Dagenham.

In 1972, Leslie Erastus was killed when a plane, piloted by rival supermarket owner F. J. Wallis of Wallis Supermarkets, crashed in the French Alps.  After his death, the Cater family decided to accept an offer of £7 million for the business from Debenhams, in 1973.

Debenhams integrated the business with their 40 food halls, which were modernised and branded as Cater Food Halls and opened a further two new Cater supermarkets. However the business struggled in the competitive 1970s market, and in 1979, Debenhams sold the business and it's 24 stores to Allied Suppliers for £9.5 million. Allied Suppliers integrated the new stores into their Presto chain and the Cater Brothers brand was no more. The Cater name, however, lived on longer in Chelmsford, with an office block that was built above the store carrying the Cater House name until it was converted into residential flats and renamed Canside in 2014.

Branches

 Altrincham
 Basildon
Bedford
 Bow
 Bromley
 Canning Town
 Catford
 Croydon
 Chelmsford
 Colchester
 Edmonton
 Eltham

 Greenwich
Hitchin
Holloway
Kingston
 Morden
 Putney
 Reading
 St Albans
 Southend
 Watford
Wood Green

References

Defunct supermarkets of the United Kingdom
Debenhams